Alma Lucrecia Méndez Velásquez (born 11 February 1997) is a Guatemalan footballer who plays as a forward for Deportivo Xela and the Guatemala women's national team.

References

1997 births
Living people
Women's association football forwards
Guatemalan women's footballers
Guatemala women's international footballers